José Bandeira (born 13 October 1961) is a Portuguese épée and foil fencer. He competed at the 1988 and 1992 Summer Olympics.

References

External links
 

1961 births
Living people
Portuguese male épée fencers
Olympic fencers of Portugal
Fencers at the 1988 Summer Olympics
Fencers at the 1992 Summer Olympics
Sportspeople from Lisbon
Portuguese male foil fencers